Inam Kulathur  is one of the Census Town in Tiruchirappalli District in the Indian state of Tamil Nadu. The old names of the village is Vellang Kulathur.

This area was covered by an agricultural reservoir of approximately 300 acres. Inam Kulathur also refers to the surrounding area. Some of the families living in this village have traditional and heritage names like "Samburuthi" etc..

Inam Kulathur was ruled by the Early Cholas, Early Pandyas, Later Cholas, Delhi Sultanate, Madurai Sultanate, Arcot Nawab and the British, prior to the formation of the Republic of India.  Tiruchirappalli played a critical role in the Ponnar - Sangar history.

Geography 
Inam Kulathur is located 18 km from Trichy Headquarters.

Economy 
The factories of Indian Oil Corporation Bottling Point and Janani Marbles and granites are located in Inam Kulathur.

The village has basic facilities such as Railway station, government hospital, Government Higher secondary school, Police station, Post office, Government Library and BSNL Telephone exchange.

The Maximum Peoples are works in IOCL, Southern Railway, Tailoring, abroad and Weekly Market Held on every Tuesday. Once upon a time Inam kulathur is having more than 300 readymade shops, near about 2000 tailoring machine is run as well as famous beedi company also having in this Village Inam Kulathur.  

One IPS officer born in this village Shri.A.Natarajan IPS currently working in ADGP Jharkhand Cadre, Jharkhand Police.

Some Soldiers Are Working in Indian Army, Indian Navy, Central Reserve Police Force, Border Security Force, and Tamilnadu Police from this Village to be proud for this Nation.

History 
Inam Kulathur has been ruled, at different times, by the Early Cholas, Early Pandyas, Later Cholas, Delhi Sultanate, Madurai Sultanate, Arcot Nawab and the British, prior to the formation of the Republic of India. Tiruchirappalli played a critical role in the Ponnar - Sangar history.Now Inamkulathur is the one of the largest village in Trichy.

Inamkulathur is also famous for Sevathagani Biryani since 1969 .

Transport 
The village is connected to bus and train. Direct bus services run from Inam kulathur  to Trichy, Srirangam, Manapparai and Viralimalai.

The village has a railway station in Trichy to Dindigul main railway line.  The railway station have rail connectivity to Trichy, Madurai, Dindigul, Tirunelveli, Villupuram, Kumbakonam.

The nearest Airport is Tiruchirappalli International Airport. The distance is 25 km.

Education 

The following educational institutions are located in Inam Kulathur 

 Vikas vidhyashram International school , 
 Awniya public school,
 Moulana Jamali matric school, 
 Vikas Arts and science college,
 Nehru College of Nursing,
 R.V.S-KVK architecture college,
 The New Polytechnic college, 
 RVS-KVK institute of management,
 H.M.Y Government Higher Secondary School, 
 Panchayat union high school 
 Jamaliyaa Arabic college
 JJ College of Engineering and Technology 
 Shivani Engineering college
 JJ Polytechnic college
 Shivani Polytechnic college 
 KMC nursing college

References 

Villages in Tiruchirappalli district